Keivan Zokaei is the co-author of "Creating a Lean and Green Business System: Techniques for Improving Profits and Sustainability," which won the Shingo Research and Professional Publication Award in 2014. The other authors include Hunter Lovins, Andy Wood, and Peter Hines.

Prior to establishing the consulting group Enterprize Excellence, Zokaei was a partner at SA Partners, and was a director at the Lean Enterprise Research Centre (LERC) at Cardiff University.

Year of birth missing (living people)
Living people
Business writers